Fan Wang may refer to:

 Wang Fan (beach volleyball) (born 1994), Chinese beach volleyball player
 Wang Fan (footballer) (born 1987), Chinese footballer
 Fann Woon Fong (born 1971), Singaporean actress, singer and model
 Fan Wang (neuroscientist), Chinese-American neuroscientist
 Wang Fan (228–266), Chinese astronomer, mathematician, politician, and writer